Afritrophon kowieensis is a species of sea snail, a marine gastropod mollusk in the family Muricidae, the murex snails or rock snails.

Description
Small snail (6mm) typically found in waters around South Africa.

Distribution

References

Afritrophon
Gastropods described in 1901